Gap analysis is a tool used in wildlife conservation to identify gaps in conservation lands (e.g., protected areas and nature reserves) or other wildlands where significant plant and animal species and their habitat or important ecological features  occur.

Conservation managers or scientists can use it as a basis for providing recommendations to improve the representativeness of nature reserves or the effectiveness of protected areas so that these areas provide the best value for conserving biological diversity. With the information that a gap analysis yields, the boundaries of protected areas may be designed to subsume 'gaps' containing significant populations of wildlife species that can enhance the long-term survival of a larger metapopulation of the species already within the managed or protected area, or to include a diversity of wildlife species or ecosystems that merit protection but are inadequately represented in an existing protected area network. Gap assessments can be done using the geographic information system: land maps that delineate topography, biological and geological features (forest cover, plains, rivers, etc.), boundaries, land ownership and use are overlaid with the distribution of wildlife species. How much of the species' distribution fall within or without the conservation lands, or within a highly exploited area etc. can be identified.

At its simplest, a gap analysis is an assessment of the extent to which a protected area system meets protection goals set by a nation or region to represent its biological diversity. Gap analyses can vary from simple exercises based on a spatial comparison of biodiversity with existing protected areas to complex studies that need detailed data gathering and analysis, mapping and use of software decision packages.

Gap types
Gap analyses generally consider a range of different “gaps” in a protected area network:

Representation gaps: either no representations of a particular species or ecosystem in any protected area, or not enough examples of the species or ecosystem represented to ensure long-term protection.
Ecological gaps: while the species or ecosystem occurs in the protected area system, occurrence is either of inadequate ecological condition, or the protected area(s) fail to address species' movements or specific ecological conditions needed for long-term survival or ecosystem functioning.
Management gaps: protected areas exist but management regimes (management objectives, governance types, or management effectiveness) do not provide full security for particular species or ecosystems given local conditions.

U.S. Gap Analysis Project

The gap analysis process itself was conceived in the 1980s, by J. Michael Scott, at the University of Idaho. He developed methods to assess endangered birds in Hawaii and began by mapping the distribution of each species individually. Then he combined data on individual species to create a map of species richness throughout the island.  Until this approach was developed there was no broad scale way to assess the level of protection given to areas rich in biodiversity.  The results of this analysis led to creation of the Hakaiau Forest National Wildlife Refuge, in one of the areas of highest species richness. In the late 1980s, Scott and other researchers at the University of Idaho Cooperative Fish and Wildlife Research Unit initiated an Idaho Gap Analysis Project as a first pilot project under the auspices of the U.S. Fish and Wildlife Service. Following two years of methods development, the program was launched in 1989 as part of the U.S. Geological Survey under the title Gap Analysis Program (GAP). GAP is now known as the Gap Analysis Project.

The Gap Analysis Project mission is to provide state, regional, and national biodiversity assessments of the conservation status of native vertebrate species, aquatic species, and natural land cover types and to facilitate the application of this information to land management activities. The stated goal of GAP is “keeping common species common”. GAP partners in the development of four core datasets: a detailed map of the terrestrial ecosystems of the United States; maps of predicted habitat distributions for the terrestrial vertebrate species for the U.S.; distribution models for aquatic species; and the Protected Areas Database of the U.S.

Critiques and limitations

Threat indicators, scale dependence & the 'modifiable areal unit problem'
Indicators of human threats, such as population growth, land use, and road density have been proposed to enhance gap analysis and further prioritize which ‘gaps’ are most immediately threatened. However, because species responses to threats vary, gap analysis can only portray potential threats. Indicators of conservation value, such as species richness, have no inherent spatial scale. Thus, the optimal scale range for the minimum mapping unit (MMU) is determined on a case-by-case basis, compromising scientific credibility with data availability and cost effectiveness. Scale dependence of the MMU as a variant of the ‘modifiable areal unit problem’, or MAUP. The larger the MMU, the more species it will contain, either over-generalizing species richness by using large units or increasing statistical uncertainty for habitat distributions by using small units. Scale dependence introduces statistical error in spatial analysis.

Mapping uncertainty
Predicted species habitat distributions in GAP data contain numerous errors of commission (attributing presence where a species is absent) and errors of omission (attributing absence where a species is present) resulting in large composite error when map layers are combined. Despite this fact, species distribution maps produced by gap analysis rarely incorporate error into the visual representation. In gap analysis applications, it can result in dramatically different conservation recommendations. In addition, residual multiscale sampling effects can be identified using a statistical covariation measure, such as sensitivity analysis.

The ‘shifting baseline syndrome’
The baseline for all National GAP projects is determined by the satellite data used to determine the vegetation cover that predicts species habitat distribution, which already includes a large percentage of anthropogenic land uses. First, because historic species distribution is not known, gap analysis results are a mere fraction of any species original habitat. Also, the static nature of gap analysis currently is not able to show the dynamic response capacity of species to change or species viability over time. Shifting baselines require that gap analysis incorporates a case-by-case consideration of management goals and definitions of conservation success.

References

External links
Web viewers for various North American gap data sets compiled by the USGS

Environmental conservation